Kip Cohen is an American entertainment and record company executive who once held positions at the Fillmore East, Columbia Records and the Herb Alpert Foundation.

Career
In 1964 Cohen was the theater production manager for The Committee and The Passion of Josef D. He later formed a company called, Sensefex, Inc. and managed the Fillmore East music venue in New York City from 1968 to 1971.  Cohen then took a position as head of A&R for Columbia Records before moving to A&M Records as Vice President of A&R (1973-1979).  In 1985 Cohen became the manager at the Wiltern Theater which was operated as part of the company, Bill Graham Presents.  Cohen was also the president of the Herb Alpert Foundation for 17 years.

References

External links 
 kipcohen.com (complete biography)

Carnegie Mellon University College of Fine Arts alumni
Living people
American music managers
American music industry executives
Music promoters
Year of birth missing (living people)
Businesspeople from Cleveland
Carnegie Mellon University alumni